The 2013–14 season was Newport County's first season in Football League Two, 61st season in the Football League and 93rd season of league football overall. This season marked County's return to the Football League for the first time since the 1987–88 season. The club finished the season in 14th place.

Season review

League

2013
The season started with the visit of Accrington Stanley. This game was selected as one of the Football League's "anniversary fixtures" to mark the 125th anniversary of the first Football League season. With Harry Worley scoring the historic first League goal, a brace from Chris Zebroski and a goal from Christian Jolley 10 minutes into the second half, County won 4–1 and were top of the League Two table. In the next game away to Northampton, Conor Washington scored his first League goal but the club suffered a 3–1 loss. The next home game, the Severnside derby with Bristol Rovers saw County's highest gate of the season; Andy Sandell's first-half penalty being enough to take all three points. The next three games were all drawn 1–1 with County slipping out of the play-off places as a result. The next home game, against Morecambe, will forever be remembered as the "Tom Naylor game": Scoring within three minutes, Billy Jones had made the perfect start to his début game before Naylor scored an own goal to level the match. Robbie Willmott restored Newport's lead before Naylor's second own goal again levelled things. With 20 minutes remaining Naylor conceded a penalty which allowed Morecambe to take the lead and eventually win the game. County's first away win of the season in the next game at Exeter, followed by a home win to Torquay United took County back to the brink of the play-off positions, but following the next two games they were back down to 12th. County then embarked on a successful spell, losing only once at Fleetwood until visiting Burton Albion in the last game of 2013. That last game was lost 1–0, but County finished the year in a play-off position.

2014
The new year began in a disastrous fashion: The wettest winter on record in Britain combined with drainage problems with the Rodney Parade pitch caused a rash of game postponements. County failed to beat bottom-of-the-table Northampton and were denied even one point when Andy Sandell's 88th-minute penalty was saved. Previous wins against Accrington, Bristol, Southend and Hartlepool were cancelled out with only two draws to show from the four matches. A solitary home win against Oxford United lifted County back to the brink of the play-offs again, but then another terrible run resulted in only three points from the next eight games. With County now lying in 14th position, any hope of the play-offs was gone. County's first double of the season against Torquay in next game briefly lifted them to 12th, but following the second 0–0 draw with Bury of the season, previous wins against Portsmouth and Chesterfield were cancelled out. Following a home loss against Plymouth Argyle County recorded only their third win of 2014 against relegation-threatened Wycombe Wanderers. In the next two games County squandered leads to draw both games, slipping down to their lowest league position of the season in the process. The penultimate game of the season was the trip to promotion-chasing York. County failed to improve on their recent form as the home side guaranteed themselves a play-off place with a 1–0 win. The final game of the season against Rochdale was an eerie reminder of County's last Football League season in 1987–88. That time the visitors has triumphed 1–0 and they would be hoping for another win to seal the League Two title. Despite taking the lead in the 28th minute, Aaron O'Connor cancelled out the advantage just before half time. Rochdale should have won the game after winning a penalty in the 83rd minute, but Matthew Lund's penalty was saved by Ian McLoughlin. Ten-man County made them pay four minutes later as Robbie Willmott's free kick was headed over Josh Lillis by Kevin Feely to seal a 2–1 victory and a happy end to County's 2013–14 campaign.

Results summary

Results by round

Squad statistics
(Substitute appearances in brackets)

Transfers

In

Out

Loans in

Loans out

Fixtures and results

Pre-season friendlies

League Two

Football League Cup

Football League Trophy

FA Cup

League table

External links
 Newport County AFC 2013-2014 : Results
 Newport County's results from season 2013/2014

References

2013-14
2013–14 Football League Two by team
Welsh football clubs 2013–14 season